Hind Khoury (born 12 June 1953) is a Palestinian economist.  She was the delegate general of the Palestine Liberation Organization in France from March 2006 until June 2010.

Biography
Born in Bethlehem, West Bank, then under Jordanian rule, to a Christian family, Khoury was educated in a school run by nuns. She studied economics at Birzeit University near Ramallah, then at the American University of Beirut before the start of the Lebanese Civil War. She then returned to Bethlehem and married an architect with whom she has three children.

After the First Intifada, she studied management at Boston University in its Beersheba campus, while working with the United Nations Development Programme.

In March 2005, she became Minister of State for Jerusalem Affairs in the Palestinian National Authority, in the government formed shortly after the election of Mahmoud Abbas to the presidency. Little known, she did not succeed in the legislative elections of January 2006. She was later sent to France as a representative of Palestine.

She is General Secretary of Kairos Palestine.

See also
Khoury

References

1953 births
People from Bethlehem
Palestinian women in politics
Living people
Palestine Liberation Organization members
Birzeit University alumni
American University of Beirut alumni
Palestinian Christians
State ministers of Palestine
Government ministers of the State of Palestine
Palestinian women ambassadors
Palestinian women economists
Ambassadors of the State of Palestine to France
Palestinian expatriates in Lebanon